Werner Breig (born 29 June 1932) is a German musicologist and music publisher.

Life 
Born in Zwickau, Breig studied Protestant sacred music at the Spandauer Kirchenmusikschule from 1950 and musicology, art history and library science at the universities University of Erlangen–Nuremberg and Hamburg from 1955. In 1962 he received his doctorate as D. Phil. at the University of Erlangen-Nuremberg with a dissertation on Heinrich Scheidemann. He worked as research assistant at the musicological seminar of the University of Freiburg and received a scholarship from the German Research Foundation for further studies. In 1973 he received his habilitation in Freiburg im Breisgau. In 1974 he became professor for musicology at the Hochschule für Musik Karlsruhe and director of the musicological institute of the Karlsruhe Institute of Technology. In 1979 he became professor for musicology at the University of Wuppertal. From 1988 until his Emeriterus in 1997, he held the chair of musicology at the Ruhr University Bochum.

His work focuses on the analysis and edition of compositions of the 17th and 18th centuries, including Johann Sebastian Bach and especially Heinrich Schütz.

Publications 
 Die Orgelwerke von Heinrich Scheidemann. Franz Steiner, Wiesbaden 1967.
 with Werner Schulz: Richard Wagner und Karlsruhe. Braun, Karlsruhe 1987.
 Bachs Orchesterwerke. Klangfarben-Musikverlag, Witten 1997.
 Schütz-Gesamtausgaben. In Reinmar Emans, Ulrich Krämer (edit): Musikeditionen im Wandel der Geschichte. de Gruyter, Berlin 2015, .

as publisher:
 Opernkomposition als Prozess. Bärenreiter, Kassel 1996.
Johann Sebastian Bach: Sämtliche Orgelwerke. Breitkopf & Härtel, Wiesbanden 2013

Further reading 
 Breig, Werner on MGG Online (subscription required)

External links

References 

20th-century German musicologists
21st-century German musicologists
Bach scholars
German music publishers (people)
German writers about music
Academic staff of the University of Wuppertal
Academic staff of Ruhr University Bochum
1932 births
Living people
People from Zwickau